KSSL 107.3 FM is a radio station licensed to Post, Texas. The station broadcasts a Classic Country format and is owned by Cathy J. Whitten.

From May 2004 to July 2011, the station was owned by Educational Media Foundation and aired a Contemporary Christian music format as an affiliate of Air 1.

References

External links
KSSL's official website

SSL
Country radio stations in the United States
Radio stations established in 1991
1991 establishments in Texas